North Carolina FC Youth (NCFC Youth) is an American soccer club and eponymous league based in Raleigh, North Carolina and serving greater Research Triangle. It is the largest youth-to-professional soccer club in the country.

Club
NCFC Youth was founded as Capital Area Soccer League (CASL) in 1974 as a not-for-profit organization and provides recreational and competitive programs for youth in the greater Raleigh-Durham-Chapel Hill metropolitan area. NCFC Youth offers teams in all divisions of North Carolina youth soccer including "classic" (first tier competitive teams in US regional and statewide leagues), "challenge" (second tier competitive teams locally), and recreational soccer. NCFC Youth "classic" teams compete at the highest level of competition in the nation including Elite Clubs National League, Region III Premier League, and USSF Development Academy in partnership with the North Carolina FC. They utilize venues throughout the area including WakeMed Soccer Park in Cary, and the WRAL Soccer Center in Raleigh. NCFC Youth sends many players on to play collegiately each year, including NCAA Division I and local NCAA Division II and NCAA Division III schools.

Merger with North Carolina FC
On March 10, 2017, North Carolina Football Club announced that it would be merging CASL and TFC Alliance, two of the largest youth clubs in the Raleigh area, and they would become part of the NCFC family as North Carolina FC Youth soccer.

League
In addition to recreational divisions which include only club teams, North Carolina FC Youth serves as a league organizer for competitive leagues in the Research Triangle area of North Carolina.

Professional alumni

References

External links

 
Sports in Raleigh-Durham
Soccer in North Carolina
United States Adult Soccer Association leagues
2017 establishments in North Carolina
Association football clubs established in 2017